Järntorget is a public square in Gothenburg, Sweden.   A hub for public transport (see Gothenburg tram system), it is located west of Haga and is the starting point for the boulevards of  Linnégatan  to the south and Nya Allén to the east; and the streets of Första Långgatan and Andra Långgatan to the west. Järntorget is the traditional home of the city's labour movement, with the Social Democratic Party, ABF, Folkteatern, Folkets hus and trade unions located here.

Järntorget ("The Iron Square") was named after the now-demolished scale which once stood on the site. It was used for weighing iron to be exported from the city's harbour. The former site of the scale is now occupied by a large, granite fountain called De fem världsdelarna. The fountain includes sculptures featuring  five bronze naked, female figures  representing five continents: Africa, America, Asia, Europe and Oceania. The fountain and the sculptures were the work of  Swedish sculptor Tore Strindberg  (1882–1968). The plinth in the centre of the fountain is decorated with the stamps which were used by the large number of Swedish iron merchants which once traded in the city. The fountain was first erected in 1927 and has been moved twice since then.

References

Related reading
Sjöblom, Axel (1945) Tore Strindberg: studie (Stockholm: Fritzes hovbokh)

Squares in Gothenburg